The France national cricket team is the men's team that represents the country of France in international cricket. They became an associate member of the International Cricket Council (ICC) in 1998, having previously been an affiliate member since 1987. The country is best known for winning the silver medal in the cricket event at the 1900 Summer Olympics in Paris, the only time cricket has been held at the Olympics. France now plays most of its matches in European Cricket Council (ECC) tournaments, although the team also appeared at the 2001 ICC Trophy.

In April 2018, the ICC decided to grant full Twenty20 International (T20I) status to all its members. Therefore, all Twenty20 matches played between France and other ICC members after 1 January 2019 will be a full T20I.

History

Early years
One of the many theories about the origin of cricket is that France could be a possible birthplace of the game. A mention of a bat and ball game called "criquet" in a village of the Pas-de-Calais occurs in a French manuscript of 1478, and the word "criquet" is an old French word meaning "post" or "wicket". However, it is equally possible that this could be an early variant of croquet.

Horace Walpole, son of former British Prime Minister Robert Walpole mentioned seeing cricket in Paris in 1766.

The Marylebone Cricket Club (MCC) were due to make the first ever international cricket tour of France, in 1789, however this was cancelled due to the French Revolution. This match was finally played in 1989, as part of the bicentennial celebrations of the revolution, with France beating the MCC by 7 wickets.

The first documented match took place in the Bois de Boulogne between Paris Cricket Club and Nottingham Amateurs in 1864. Paris Cricket Club published a book explaining the game the following year.

Olympic Games

The one and only appearance for cricket at the Olympic Games took place in 1900, with the French team losing the only match played, and thus remaining the reigning silver medal holders to this day. The French team however, consisted solely of British residents in Paris, members of the Standard Athletic Club. The match was twelve-a-side and the following players represented France:

 Philip Tomalin (captain
 William Anderson
 William Attrill
 John Braid
 W. Browning (wicket-keeper)
 Robert Horne
 Timothée Jordan
 Arthur MacEvoy
 Douglas Robinson
 H. F. Roques
 Alfred Schneidau
 Henry Terry

The Standard Athletic Club restaged the 1900 Olympic Cricket match in 1987, and France played the MCC in Meudon in 1989.

In 1910, France took part in an exhibition tournament in Brussels, also involving the MCC, the Netherlands and Belgium. They played one game, against the Netherlands, winning by 63 runs.

The modern era
Many cricket clubs folded after the Second World War, but an influx of English and Asian immigrants led to a resurgence of the game in the early 1980s. The current French Cricket Association was formed in 1987, and they gained Affiliate membership of the ICC the same year.

After the win in the 1989 match mentioned above, there were a handful of tours from English county teams, and France toured Austria in 1996, losing both matches against the national team. In 1997, they played in the European Nations Cup in Zuoz, Switzerland, winning after beating Germany by one run in the final. This match was included in the Wisden Cricketers' Almanack list of 100 best matches of the 20th century as David Bordes ran the winning leg bye with a fractured skull.

They played in the European Championship in the Netherlands in 1998, finishing eighth after losing to Germany in a play-off. They became an associate member of the ICC the same year. They finished third in Division Two of the 2000 European Championship.

France played their only ICC Trophy in the 2001 tournament in Canada, though they did not progress beyond the first round. The following year, they finished fifth in Division Two of the European Championships, and finished as runners up in the 2004 tournament. They finished sixth in the 2006 tournament after losing a play-off to Guernsey.

In 2008, France finished fourth in Division 2 of the European Championship. In 2010, France finished third in the same competition, narrowly missing out on qualification for the 2010 ICC World Cricket League Division Eight. In 2011, they finished sixth in the ICC Europe Division 1 T20 Championship after losing the fifth place play-off match to Norway. In 2012, they finished second in the ICC European World Cricket League 8 Qualifier, held in La Manga, Spain; again missing out on qualification for Division 8 of the World Cricket League.

In 2018, France competed at the ICC World Twenty20 Europe Region Qualifier in Netherlands.

In 2021, France played their first ever T20 international match against Norway in a tri-nation series in Germany, winning the match by 4 wickets.

Grounds

Tournament History

ICC Trophy

1979 to 1986 inclusive: Not eligible – Not an ICC member
1990 to 1997 inclusive: Not eligible – ICC affiliate member
2001: First round
2005: Did not qualify

European Championship

1991: 8th place
1993: 1st place (Division Two)
1998: 3rd place (Division Two)
2002: 2nd place (Division Two)
2006: 6th place (Division Two)
2008: 4th place (Division Two)
2010: 3rd place (Division Two)
2011: 6th place (Division One, T20)
2013: 5th place (Division One, T20)

Records and Statistics 

International match summary — France
 
Last updated 31 July 2022

Twenty20 International 
 Highest score: 183/7 v. Estonia on 30 July 2022 at Kerava National Cricket Ground, Kerava.
 Highest individual score: 109, Gustav Mckeon v. Switzerland on 25 July 2022 at Tikkurila Cricket Ground, Vantaa.  
 Best bowling figures in an innings: 4/20, Zain Ahmad v. Switzerland on 25 July 2022 at Tikkurila Cricket Ground, Vantaa.

T20I record versus other nations

Records complete to T20I #1712. Last updated 31 July 2022.

Notable players
The following French national team players have played first-class or List A cricket:

Waseem Bhatti – played first-class cricket for Pakistan International Airlines in 1998 and 1999
Simon Hewitt – played first-class cricket for Oxford University in 1984
David Holt – played first-class cricket for Loughborough UCCE in 2005 and 2006
Paul Wakefield – played List A cricket for Cheshire in 1983

See also
 List of France Twenty20 International cricketers
 France women's national cricket team

References

External links
 Official site

1987 establishments in France
Cricket in France
France in international cricket
National cricket teams
Cricket